Max Vetter (born 17 March 1892, date of death unknown) was a German rower who competed for the German Empire in the 1912 Summer Olympics.

The German team won the bronze medal in the men's eight. Team members were Otto Liebing, Max Bröske, Fritz Bartholomae, Willi Bartholomae, Werner Dehn, Rudolf Reichelt, Hans Matthiae, and Kurt Runge.

References

External links
profile

1892 births
Year of death missing
Rowers at the 1912 Summer Olympics
Olympic rowers of Germany
Olympic bronze medalists for Germany
Olympic medalists in rowing
German male rowers
Medalists at the 1912 Summer Olympics
European Rowing Championships medalists